Emmeline Pethick-Lawrence, Baroness Pethick-Lawrence (21 October 1867 – 11 March 1954) was a British women's rights activist and suffragette.

Early life
Pethick-Lawrence was born in Bristol as Emmeline Pethick. Her father, Henry Pethick, was a businessman, a merchant of South American hide, who became owner of the Weston Gazette, and a Weston town commissioner. She was the second of 13 children, and was sent away to boarding school at the age of eight. Her younger sister, Dorothy Pethick (the tenth child), was also a suffragette.

Career and marriage
From 1891 to 1895, Pethick worked as a "sister of the people" for the West London Methodist Mission at Cleveland Hall, near Fitzroy Square. She helped Mary Neal run a girls' club at the mission. In 1895, she and Mary Neal left the mission to co-found the Espérance Club, a club for young women and girls that would not be subject to the constraints of the mission, and could experiment with dance and drama. Pethick also started Maison Espérance, a dressmaking cooperative with a minimum wage, an eight-hour day and a holiday scheme.

Pethick married Frederick Lawrence in 1901 after he changed his political views to be more Liberal. The couple took the joint name Pethick-Lawrence and kept separate bank accounts to give them autonomy.

Activism

Pethick-Lawrence was a member of the Suffrage Society and was introduced to Emmeline Pankhurst in 1906. She became treasurer of the Women's Social and Political Union (WSPU), which Pankurst had founded in 1903, and raised £134,000 over six years.

Pethick-Lawrence attended a number of events with Pankhurst including the aborted visit to the Prime Minister in late June 1908, along with Jessie Stephenson, Florence Haig, Maud Joachim and Mary Phillips after which there was some violent treatment of women protestors, and a number of arrests.

Pethick-Lawrence founded the publication Votes for Women with her husband in 1907. The couple was arrested and imprisoned in 1912 for conspiracy following demonstrations that involved breaking windows, even though they had disagreed with that form of action.

In April 1913, Frederick Pethick-Lawrence was made bankrupt after he refused to pay the £900 costs of the prosecutions of Emmeline Pethick-Lawrence, himself and Emmeline Pankhurst in the Old Bailey for conspiracy to commit property damage. The Irish Times noted mordantly "This step does not mean that Mr Pethick-Lawrence is insolvent, because he is a wealthy man.After being released from prison, the Pethick-Lawrences were unceremoniously ousted from the WSPU by Emmeline Pankhurst and her daughter Christabel, because of their ongoing disagreement over the more radical forms of activism that the Pethick-Lawrences opposed. Her sister Dorothy Pethick also left the WSPU in protest at their treatment, having previously taken part and been imprisoned for militant action. The Pethick-Lawrences then joined Agnes Harben and others starting the United Suffragists, which took over the publication of Votes for Women'' and was open to women and men, militants and non-militants alike.

In 1938 Pethick-Lawrence published her memoirs, which discuss the radicalization of the suffrage movement just before the First World War.  She was involved in the setting up of the Suffragette Fellowship with Edith How-Martyn to document the movement.

In 1945, she became Lady Pethick-Lawrence when her husband was made a baron.

Posthumous recognition
Pethick-Lawrence's name and picture (and those of 58 other women's suffrage supporters) are on the plinth of the statue of Millicent Fawcett in Parliament Square, London, unveiled in 2018.

A blue plaque was unveiled in Pethick-Lawrence's honour by Weston Town Council and Weston Civic Society in March 2020. It was placed on a wall Lewisham House, Weston-super-Mare (known as 'Trewartha' when she lived there for fourteen years as a child).

Foundations, organisations and settlements
 Espérance Club
 Guild of the Poor Brave Things
 Independent Labour Party
 Kibbo Kift
 West London Methodist Mission
 Women's International League
 Women's Social and Political Union (WSPU)

See also 
Hugh Price Hughes
List of suffragists and suffragettes
List of women's rights activists
Mark Guy Pearse, whom Lady Pethick-Lawrence described as "the greatest influence upon the first half of my life".
Women's suffrage organisations

References

External links

 Kibbo Kift official history
 Spartacus References
 Weslyan Methodists
 West London Mission

1867 births
1954 deaths
Journalists from Bristol
British feminists
English pacifists
British baronesses
Politicians from Bristol
Women of the Victorian era
Labour Party (UK) parliamentary candidates
British socialist feminists
Women's Social and Political Union
Women's International League for Peace and Freedom people